Murilo Ferraz Affonso (born 19 June 1991) is a Brazilian cyclist, who is currently suspended from the sport.

Major results

2013
 Pan American Under-23 Road Championships
4th Time trial
6th Road race
2014
 1st  Time trial, South American Games
 5th Overall Volta Ciclística Internacional do Rio Grande do Sul
2015
 4th Time trial, Pan American Games
 4th Overall Vuelta del Uruguay
2016
 1st  Overall Volta Ciclística Internacional do Rio Grande do Sul
1st Stage 1
2017
2nd Overall Vuelta del Uruguay
1st Stage 3b (TTT)
2018
 1st Stage 2a (TTT) Vuelta del Uruguay

References

External links

1991 births
Living people
Brazilian male cyclists
Brazilian road racing cyclists
Cyclists at the 2015 Pan American Games
South American Games gold medalists for Brazil
South American Games medalists in cycling
Competitors at the 2014 South American Games
Pan American Games competitors for Brazil